Just Listen may refer to:

 Just Listen (novel), a 2006 novel by Sarah Dessen
 Just Listen, a 2009 book by Mark Goulston
 Just Listen (Seven album), 2003
 Just Listen (Joey Baron album), 2013
 Just Listen (EP), an EP by Younha
 Just Listen, a 1976 album by Alan Steward
 Just Listen, a 2000 album by Pat Kirtley
 "Just Listen", a song by Ivor Cutler from A Wet Handle
 "Just Listen", a poem by Peter Johnson